The Corinthia Hotel Budapest at the Elizabeth Boulevard in Budapest, is a historic luxury hotel. Opened in 1896 as the Grand Hotel Royal, a hub for the elite of 19th century society, the hotel has undergone extensive modification throughout the 20th century, and has in the 21st century been restored and reopened as the Corinthia.

Historical background 
The course of the Grand Boulevard (Nagykörút) was marked out during the 1870s together with Andrássy Avenue, Budapest's most impressive avenue. The road went through a thinly populated part of suburban Budapest, so its development was rather slow, and only a few buildings were constructed in the 1870s. The real development of the Grand Boulevard began once Andrássy Street was completed in 1884.

Grand Hotel Royal 
The Grand Hotel Royal was originally opened for visitors of the Millennium Exhibition in 1896. A joint-stock company, established by the hotel owners, including the chairman Mr. Frigyes Glück and the planner architect Mr. Rezső Ray, had succeeded in purchasing the largest piece of real estate on the developing Grand Boulevard. By this time the Grand Boulevard had become the main artery of the capital city and the hotel rooms enjoyed superb views of this most attractive part of Budapest. The official opening ceremony was on 30 April 1896. 

The hotel comprised 350 guest rooms, including the adjacent building and attic rooms for the staff. The architectural style was French renaissance and the latest technology was used throughout.

Besides the facilities (post office, bank, hairdresser, ticket office) guests and the public had access to two restaurants, a café, a Gerbeaud confectionery and private dining rooms. In the cellar could be found not only a grocery store but also a bar. In the western cour d'honneur, a palm garden made the court more attractive. After its opening, the Royal became popular, a regular haunt of contemporary Hungarian writers and journalists, including Jenő Heltay, Sándor Hunyadi, Lajos Nagy and Gyula Krúdy.

The first screening in Budapest of a motion picture by the Lumiére brothers also took place at the hotel and later became highly successful as a regular exhibition. Several classical concerts were held in the Royal Ballroom, and Béla Bartók, the Hungarian composer, frequently conducted music there. The Royal soon became a topic of journalists. In 1909, the first Hungarian airplane was exhibited in one of the hotel's cours d'honneur. 

With the growing popularity of the motion picture, the Ballroom ceased to exist as a part of the hotel and was reconstructed as the Royal Apollo cinema. After the Second World War, it reopened its doors in 1959 as the Red Star cinema with its entrance on Hársfa Street.

Decline, fall and rise 
From the Second World War until 1953 the Royal served not as a hotel but as an office building. In 1953 the building was restored to become a hotel, but three years later the roof was destroyed by fire. This unfortunate event forced the architects to reconstruct the whole building. The Royal was intended to be a hotel representative of the age, since none of today's hotels on the Danube bank had been established yet. István Janáky, architect of the reconstruction, reconsidered the building's interior with the 'space idealism' of his age. Today, no remaining fragments of the original interior can be found. The demolition and reconstruction in 1956 destroyed every trace. In 1961 the Royal was re-opened as a hotel, with 367 guest rooms. Over the years the hotel became obsolete and finally, it was closed in the autumn of 1991, although the cinema continued working until the autumn of 1997. The original visitor's book contains the signatures of some of the most important people from Europe and the rest of the world. Just a few examples are Max Reinhardt, Asta Nilsen, Saljapin, Valdemar Psylander, Professor Barnard, Roberto Benzi, Mario del Monaco, Anna Moffo, Renata Scotto, Elisabeth Schwarzkopf, Amerigo Tot, Valentina Tereskova.

Royal Spa 
The spa was planned and built by the architect Vilmos Freund in 1886–88. At that time it contained steam baths, wave and shower baths, electric baths, pneumatic chamber and a medical room with cold water. Contemporary journalists were fascinated by the spa's appearance. In 1903 direct access was created for hotel guests. After the First World War, Freund was declared bankrupt and his heirs sold the spa in 1923 to the Royal Nagyszálló Rt. The spa operated until 1944 but from that time it has been closed. The abandoned, obsolete spa was rediscovered in 1983 and, according to the original documents, there were plans to use the spa area for parking facilities. János Dianóczki, who was in charge of planning the multi-storey car park, turned down the proposal. The media and the public supported him and his decision made it possible for the current owners to restore the spa today.

Corinthia era 
The Royal owes its revival to the Corinthia Group. The Maltese-based investment group operates four and five-star hotels in a number of countries, including Malta, The UK, Portugal, The Gambia, Tunisia, Turkey, the Czech Republic, Russia and Hungary. The Corinthia Grand Hotel Royal was restored as a result of a €100 million investment, the largest scale hotel refurbishment project in Hungarian history.

References

External links 
 Corinthia Hotel Budapest website

Hotels in Budapest